New Zealand competed at the 1996 Summer Olympics in Atlanta, United States. The New Zealand Olympic Committee was represented by 97 athletes and 60 officials. Former Olympic swimmer Dave Gerrard was the team's chef de mission.

Medal tables

Archery

New Zealand sent only one archer to Atlanta. He was defeated in the first round.

Athletics

Track and road

Field

Combined

Badminton

New Zealand sent two women to compete in two competitions of the Olympic Badminton tournament.

Boxing

Canoeing

New Zealand sent one man to compete in one canoeing event.

Slalom

Cycling

Road

Track

1 km time trial

Points race

Sprint

Pursuit

Mountain bike
Mountain biking was introduced as an Olympic discipline for the 1996 Games. The two strongest women, Kathy Lynch and Mary Grigson, gained New Zealand two qualifying positions for the Olympics; no New Zealand men qualified. Grigson accepted an offer to race for Australia—she competed for them at the Olympics in 1996 and 2000—and left New Zealand, so the New Zealand Mountain Bike Association decided to nominate just one competitor for the New Zealand Olympic team.

Equestrian

Eventing
New Zealand entered three competitors in the mixed individual eventing event; two men and one woman. New Zealand also competed in team eventing.

Jumping

Judo

Rowing

New Zealand qualified five boats for the 1996 Summer Olympics: men's single sculls, men's pair, men's coxless four, men's lightweight double sculls, and women's double sculls.

Men

Women

Sailing

 Aaron McIntosh – Men's Mistral One Design
 Barbara Kendall – Women's Mistral One Design – silver medal
 Craig Monk – Finn
 Sharon Ferris – Europe
 Rohan Cooke & Andrew Stone – Men's 470
 Leslie Egnot & Jan Shearer – Women's 470
 Hamish Pepper – Laser
 Rod Davis & Don Cowie – Star
 Rex Sellers & Brian Jones – Tornado
 Kelvin Harrap & Sean Clarkson & Jamie Gale – Soling

Shooting

Swimming

Table tennis

Tennis

Volleyball

Beach volleyball

References

sports-reference

Nations at the 1996 Summer Olympics
1996
Summer Olympics